Hargate Wall  is a hamlet in Derbyshire, England, situated northeast of Buxton and now part of Wormhill.

The name Hargate Wall derives from Old English Herdwyk-waella, meaning "herd farm by the spring", so the first settlement was probably around AD 700–950.

The hamlet now consists of several cottages, farms and property called Hayward Farm and Hargate Hall (completed and lived in by Robert Whitehead).

On the edge of Hargate Wall is a Neolithic barrow known as Wind Low  Excavations have revealed the remains of a Neolithic chieftain and his family, a female member of a Celtic tribe and a Celtic necklace which is now in the Weston Park Museum in Sheffield.

References

Towns and villages of the Peak District
Hamlets in Derbyshire
High Peak, Derbyshire